The Ugly Truth is a collaborative studio album by Prolyphic & Reanimator. It was released on Strange Famous Records in 2008. It features guest appearances from Macromantics, B. Dolan, Alias, and Sage Francis.

Critical reception

Bob Gulla of The Phoenix described the album as "a blissed-out merger of Prolyphic's smart rap/poetry and Reanimator's perfectly complementary beats and motifs." Matt Rinaldi of AllMusic wrote, "Prolyphic lays his heartfelt verses over Reanimator's inventive beatwork, which combines loops, samples, and live instrumentation." Alan Ranta of PopMatters commented that "The beats are glowing with live instrument samples and boom-bap drums, easily on par with the finest yet released by the man, while the words glide as if born to those sounds."

Track listing

Personnel
Credits adapted from liner notes.

 Prolyphic – vocals
 Reanimator – production, mixing (15)
 Macromantics – vocals (4)
 Sandrine – additional backing vocals (4)
 Jared Paul – additional backing vocals (4, 6)
 B. Dolan – vocals (6)
 Sage Francis – vocals (6)
 Alias – vocals (6), vocal recording (6), vocal engineering (6), mixing (except 15)
 Tom Inhaler – vocal recording (except 6), vocal engineering (except 6)
 Irena Mihalinec – artwork
 Josh Behan – photography

References

External links
 

2008 albums
Collaborative albums
Hip hop albums by American artists
Strange Famous Records albums